Poblenou is a Barcelona Metro station in Poblenou, a formerly industrial area of Barcelona's Sant Martí district. The location of the station is in the intersections of Carrer de Pujades with carrer de Bilbao and carrer de Lope de Vega.

It's served by L4 (yellow line). It was opened in  along with the lines from Barceloneta to Selva de Mar.

Services

See also
List of Barcelona Metro stations

External links
Trenscat.com

Railway stations in Spain opened in 1977
El Poblenou
Transport in Sant Martí (district)
Barcelona Metro line 4 stations